Billy Roy Wilson (born William Roy Wilson Jr. on December 18, 1939) is a senior United States district judge of the United States District Court for the Eastern District of Arkansas.

Education and career
Born in Little Rock, Arkansas, Wilson received a Bachelor of Arts degree from Hendrix College in 1962 and a Juris Doctor from Vanderbilt University Law School in 1965. He was in private practice in Texarkana, Arkansas from 1965 to 1966. He was a deputy prosecuting attorney of Miller County, Arkansas from 1965 to 1966. He was in the United States Navy as a lieutenant (junior grade) from 1966 to 1969. He was in private practice in Little Rock, Arkansas from 1969 to 1993.

Federal judicial service
Wilson is a United States District Judge of the United States District Court for the Eastern District of Arkansas. Wilson was nominated by President Bill Clinton on August 6, 1993, to a seat vacated by G. Thomas Eisele. He was confirmed by the United States Senate on September 30, 1993, and received his commission on October 1, 1993. He assumed senior status on October 1, 2008.

Name change
On January 12, 2011, Wilson's name was legally changed from William Roy Wilson Jr. to Billy Roy Wilson, which was his intended name at birth. Two days later, the United States District Court directed that all cases before Wilson hereafter reflect his new name.

References

Sources

1939 births
Living people
20th-century American judges
21st-century American judges
Hendrix College alumni
Judges of the United States District Court for the Eastern District of Arkansas
Lawyers from Little Rock, Arkansas
United States district court judges appointed by Bill Clinton
Vanderbilt University Law School alumni